Neostigmine/glycopyrronium bromide, sold under the brand name Prevduo , is a fixed-dose combination medication used for the reversal of the effects of non-depolarizing neuromuscular blocking agents after surgery. It contains neostigmine as the methylsulfate, a cholinesterase inhibitor, and glycopyrronium bromide, an antimuscarinic agent.

Neostigmine/glycopyrronium bromide was approved for medical use in the United Kingdom in 2007, and in the United States in February 2023.

Medical uses 
Neostigmine/glycopyrronium bromide is indicated for the reversal of the effects of non-depolarizing neuromuscular blocking agents after surgery, while decreasing the peripheral muscarinic effects (e.g., bradycardia and excessive secretions) associated with cholinesterase inhibition following non-depolarizing neuromuscular blocking agent reversal administration.

References 

Acetylcholinesterase inhibitors
Combination drugs
Muscarinic antagonists